Radio Mayak is a radio broadcasting company in Russia, owned by VGTRK. Mayak is the Russian word for "lighthouse" or "beacon". As well as Radio Mayak proper (which broadcasts news, talk shows, and popular music), the company is also responsible for the youth music channel Radio Yunost.

Radio Mayak was established in August 1964 as a major All-Union Radio station dedicated to news and light music. Its name and format were probably inspired by the BBC Light Programme. Until recently it was transmitted on long wave, medium wave and shortwave. Now is transmitting under longwave band, on 78 kHz. Advertising was introduced in the 1980s. The station's trademark Moscow Nights tuning signal is played every 30 minutes.

References

External links

Radio stations established in 1964
Radio stations in Russia
Radio stations in the Soviet Union
Russian-language radio stations
1964 establishments in the Soviet Union